The Bukit Timah Race Course was a venue for Thoroughbred horse racing in the Bukit Timah area of Singapore. Built by the Bukit Timah Turf Club, it was opened on 15 April 1933 by the Sir Cecil Clementi, Governor of Singapore. There was no racing from 1941 through 1946 as a result of World War II.

During its sixty-six years, Bukit Timah Race Course was visited by numerous Singapore and foreign dignitaries including a 1972 visit by racing fan a Thoroughbred owner, Her Majesty Queen Elizabeth II and Prince Philip and Princess Anne. In honor of her visit, the Queen Elizabeth II Cup was established.

In 1959 the Singapore Derby was revived at Bukit Timah Race Course and was the feature race on its final day of operation on 25 July 1999. It was closed to make way for Kranji Racecourse.

Turf City

Turf City was opened in 1999 and had a 10-year lease with heyday until 2010, with the first tenant is Singapore Agro Agricultural (SAA). SLA wanted this tenant to extend which is only allowed until 1 March 2012. By the time, SH Cogent (Cogent Land Capital) took over the Turf City portion and several shops had been closed and demolished. Turf City would be renamed 'The Grandstand', however this would be opened to all in July 2012.

As connectivity is poor until 2015, shuttle buses were originally provided from Toa Payoh or Clementi. After that, it was being shortened to Botanic Gardens or Sixth Avenue. Bukit Timah Race Course area will be finally shut down in 2023, to make way for the future development including the MRT station at the former Turf City.

References

Defunct horse racing venues in Singapore
Turf Clubs in Singapore